Strangers at Sunrise is a 1969 South African-American film starring George Montgomery.

Plot
During the Second Boer War in 1900, an American mining engineer is sentenced to death by the British for aiding and abetting the Boer enemy. The engineer escapes from custody and takes refuge at an isolated Boer farm, where he forms a relationship with the Boer family. When three deserters from the British army arrive, the engineer must protect himself and the family.

Cast
 George Montgomery as Grant Merrick
 Deana Martin as Julie Beyers
 Brian O'Shaughnessy as Corporal Caine

Production
Filming took place in late 1968 in South Africa. Deana Martin was Dean Martin's daughter.

References

External links
Strangers at Sunrise at IMDb
Strangers at Sunrise at BFI

1969 films
South African drama films
English-language South African films
1960s English-language films